Iunits may refer to:

 Toyota i-units, single seater four wheeled Toyota concept cars
 IShares (exchange-traded fund) brand name formerly known as iUnits in Canada